Orphinus (Orphinus) minor, is a species of skin beetle found in India and Sri Lanka.

Description
Male antennal terminal segment is spherical. Integument black. Elytra finely punctate clothed with yellow setae.

References 

Dermestidae
Insects of Sri Lanka
Insects described in 1915